"Do Me Right" is a song written by Abrim Tilmon and James Mitchell and performed by the Detroit Emeralds. The song was produced by Katouzzion and arranged by Abrim Tilmon and Sonny Sanders.

In the United States, it reached No. 7 on the R&B chart and No. 43 on the Billboard Hot 100 in 1971. The song was featured on their 1971 album, Do Me Right.

It is also the title of a different song released as a single by R&B singer Pebbles from her 1987 self-titled debut album. Her single reached #67 on the R&B charts.

Chart performance

Other versions
Denise LaSalle released a version of the song as a single in 1973 in the United Kingdom, which did not chart.

References

1971 songs
1971 singles
1973 singles
The Detroit Emeralds songs